The Hagler-Cole Cabin is a historic summer cabin on Mt. Pisgah Loop in Bella Vista, Arkansas.  It is a two-story wood-frame structure with a wide overhanging front gable roof, which presents a single story to the front because of a steeply sloping lot.  The front has a fieldstone chimney near the center, with a corner entry to the right, and a projecting gable-roofed screen porch to the left.  Built c. 1920, it is one of a few relatively unaltered cabins (of some 500 originally built) in the Bella Vista area.

The cabin was listed on the National Register of Historic Places in 1988.

See also
National Register of Historic Places listings in Benton County, Arkansas

References

Houses on the National Register of Historic Places in Arkansas
Houses completed in 1920
Houses in Benton County, Arkansas
National Register of Historic Places in Benton County, Arkansas
Buildings and structures in Bella Vista, Arkansas
1920 establishments in Arkansas